Clarisse Albrecht (born 28 June 1978) is a French actress, screenwriter, producer, recording artist, singer-songwriter and former model. She's a multi-lingual artist, performing and writing in English, Portuguese, French and Spanish. She currently lives between France and Dominican Republic.

Early life
Clarisse Albrecht was born in Rueil Malmaison, France to a French father and a Cameroonian mother. She split her childhood between France, Guinea-Bissau and Mozambique.

In the early nineties, her family went back to France. While in high-school, she started to sing in a gospel choir as a soloist and background vocalist. While studying Cinema at La Sorbonne Nouvelle, in Paris, she joined, as a background vocalist, a band performing Soul-Funk covers. She soon left the band to focus on creating her own musical identity.
In 2004, she went to Brazil where a friend wrote to her a poem where he describes her as a "Mulata Universal". Albrecht came back to Paris with that nickname in mind, inspiring her to write her own songs in Portuguese, the language of her childhood in Mozambique. She started to work on her own songs with her longtime friend LS as co-composer and producer.

Career
In May 2010, she released independently (digital download only) her debut single "Você Me Dá", a deep-house tune with Brazilian music and soul influences. The song has been aired on more than 33 countries and over 125 radios. It has been two times nominated at the MOAMAS 2011 (Museke Online African Music Awards) as Best African Diaspora Song and Afro-Fusion. It finally won the prize as Best African Diaspora Song.
In February 2013, she released her second single "Não Posso Parar", a tune with a stronger Soul Music influence.

On 22 June 2015 she released her debut album entitled "Mulata Universal".

Since 2016, she's been working as a screenwriter for music-videos and feature films. Alongside her life partner, Ivan Herrera, she wrote Bantú Mama, directed by Ivan Herrera. The film made its World Premiere at SXSW, being the first Dominican film to be selected by the festival.

Discography

Singles
2010: "Você Me Dá" 
2013: "Não Posso Parar
2013: "No Puedo Parar"
2015: "Deixa Rolar"

Albums
2015: "Mulata Universal"

Participations
2005: Différent, album by LS : Additional vocals on "At Home"
2008: Cool Off Chillout (A Fine Selection of Chillout Music) - "Não Posso Parar (Soulavenue's Sweet Teardrop Mix)" (Sine Music, Germany)
2010: "Você Me Dá" featured in "Soul Unsigned : The 2010 Summer Session" (Soul Unsigned, United Kingdom)
2010: "Você Me Dá - Lil'Lion House Mix" featured in "Summer Club, le son electropical 2010" (Wagram, France)
2011: "Você Me Dá - SoulAvenue's Tropicalita Mix" featured in The Bossa Night Club, Vol. 2 (Lola's Records, Germany)
2011: "Não Posso Parar (Soulavenue's Sweet Teardrop Mix)" and "Você Me Dá - SoulAvenue's Tropicalita Mix" featured on SoulAvenue's album "Swept Away"

Videography
2010: "Você Me Dá", directed by Ivan Herrera
2013: "Não Posso Parar, directed by Ivan Herrera

Awards
2023: Bantú Mama, directed by Ivan Herrera: Outstanding International Motion Picture, The 54th NAACP Image Awards
2022: Bantú Mama, directed by Ivan Herrera: Best Performer, Durban International Film Festival 2022
2011: "Você Me Dá", Best African Diaspora Song, MOAMAS 2011

Filmography

Acting Credits 

Other credits

References

External links
 
Clarisse Albrecht's website
Clarisse Albrecht's Instagram
Clarisse Albrecht's Twitter
Clarisse Albrecht's Videos on YouTube

1978 births
Living people
Actresses from Paris
French actresses
Singers from Paris
English-language singers from France
Portuguese-language singers of France
21st-century Cameroonian women singers
Soul singers
French television actresses
French people of Cameroonian descent
21st-century French women singers